Floyd Delafield Crosby, A.S.C. (December 12, 1899September 30, 1985) was an Academy Award-winning American cinematographer, descendant of the Van Rensselaer family, and father of musicians Ethan and David Crosby.

Early life 

Crosby was born and raised in West Philadelphia, the son of Julia Floyd and Frederick Van Schoonhoven Crosby. Through his maternal grandmother, he was descended from the prominent Van Rensselaer family.

His maternal grandfather was Dr.Francis Delafield. His maternal uncle was Edward Henry Delafield (18801955).

Career 

During his career, Floyd Crosby was involved in the cinematography of more than 100 full-length movies. He won the 1931 Academy Award for Best Cinematography for his work on the film Tabu: A Story of the South Seas. In 1973, Crosby participated in an oral history sponsored by the American Film Institute, part of which dealt with his work on Tabu: A Story of the South Seas. He filmed the Bedaux expedition in 1934. 

He was also the cinematographer for High Noon (1952), for which he won a Golden Globe Award. Crosby also worked with B-movie director Roger Corman on several films.

Crosby served as a cinematographer for the U.S. Army Air Corps film wing, and made flight training films in World War II. He left the Air Corps in 1946.

Personal life 

On December 11, 1930, he married Aliph Van Cortlandt Whitehead. She was the daughter of John Brinton Whitehead. Together, they had two children:
 Ethan Crosby (1937–1997), a reclusive singer-songwriter
 David Crosby (1941–2023), a member of the Byrds and Crosby, Stills, Nash & Young

Crosby divorced in 1960 and married Betty Cormack Andrews in the same year. He retired in 1972 to Ojai, California, where he died in 1985.

Selected filmography  

 Tabu: A Story of the South Seas (1931)
 Mato Grosso: the Great Brazilian Wilderness (1931)
 The Plow That Broke the Plains (1936)
 The River (1937)
 The Fight for Life (1940)
 Power and the Land (1940)
 It's All True
 The Land (1942)
 Traffic with the Devil (1946)
 My Father's House (1947)
 Of Men and Music (1950)
 The Brave Bulls (1952)
 Devil Take Us (1952)
 High Noon (1952)
 The Steel Lady (1953)
 Five Guns West (1954)
 Naked Paradise (1956)
 Attack of the Crab Monsters (1956)
 Rock All Night (1956)
 She Gods of Shark Reef (1957)
 The Old Man and the Sea (1958)
 The Screaming Skull (1958)
 War of the Satellites (1958)
 Machine-Gun Kelly (1958)
 I Mobster (1958)
 The Cry Baby Killer (1958)
 The Wonderful Country (1959)
 Crime and Punishment U.S.A. (1959)
 Freckles (1960)
 House of Usher (1960)
 The Explosive Generation (1960)
 The Pit and the Pendulum (1961)
 A Cold Wind in August (1961)
 The Premature Burial (1962)
 Tales of Terror (1962)
 Hand of Death (1962)
 The Young Racers (1963)
 The Raven (1963)
 The Yellow Canary (1963)
 X: The Man with the X-ray Eyes (1963)
 Black Zoo (1963)
 The Haunted Palace (1963)
 Sallah Shabati (1964)
 The Comedy of Terrors (1964)
 Pajama Party (1964)
 Indian Paint (1965)
 Fireball 500 (1966)
 The Cool Ones (1967)

References

External links  

 

1899 births
1985 deaths
Military personnel from Philadelphia
Photographers from Philadelphia
American cinematographers
American people of Dutch descent
Best Cinematographer Academy Award winners
Burials at Sleepy Hollow Cemetery
Delafield family